Kitney Island is a small island  east-northeast of the Smith Rocks,  southwest of the Wiltshire Rocks, and  northwest of the Paterson Islands, off the coast of Mac. Robertson Land, Antarctica. The Lars Christensen Expedition (1936) first mapped this island which, though left unnamed, was included in a small group named by them "Spjotoyskjera" (now the Wiltshire Rocks). It was remapped by the Australian National Antarctic Research Expedition (ANARE) in 1956, and was named by the Antarctic Names Committee of Australia for V.J. Kitney, a supervising technician (radio) at Mawson Station in 1968.

See also 
 List of Antarctic and sub-Antarctic islands

References

Islands of Mac. Robertson Land